Steven Amsterdam (born in New York City on January 31, 1966) is an American writer. He lives in Melbourne, Australia, where he also works as a palliative care nurse.

Biography
Steven Amsterdam was born and raised in New York City. He attended Bronx High School of Science, the University of Chicago and the University of Melbourne. He worked as a map editor, book jacket designer and pastry chef before moving to Australia in 2003. His writing has appeared in The Age, Conde Nast Traveller, Five Chapters, Huffington Post, Meanjin, The Monthly, Monument, Overland, Sleepers Almanac and Torpedo's Greatest Hits.

His first book, Things We Didn't See Coming was first published in Australia by Sleepers Publishing in 2009. Alternately described as a novel or linked story collection, the book follows the narrator from Y2K into the future. The book won The Age Book of the Year for 2009 and was shortlisted for the New South Wales Premier's Prize. In 2010, the book was published by Pantheon Books in the United States, where it was a Barnes & Noble Great New Writer selection, and by Harvill Secker in the United Kingdom, where it was longlisted for The Guardian First Book Award. The Guardian called the book "refreshingly unapocalyptic". Starting in 2011, the book was selected for the Victorian Certificate of Education for year 12 English.

What the Family Needed, a novel that follows a family with special powers over decades, was first published by Sleepers Publishing in 2011, where it was shortlisted for The Age Book of the Year, the ALS Gold Medal, and longlisted for the Prime Minister's Literary Award and the International Dublin Literary Award.

The Easy Way Out, first published in 2016 by Hachette Australia, is set in an unnamed city where assisted dying is legal. The book, which follows the story of one such assistant, has been called "a perfect storm of a novel." by the Sydney Morning Herald and "incredibly funny" by The Australian Book Review. It has been shortlisted for the ALS Gold Medal and longlisted for the Miles Franklin Award.

In 2020 Steven won the Horne Prize with his essay 'There and Here'. The essay tackles the loneliness experienced by ex-patriots as a result of travel restrictions during the COVID-19 pandemic.

Amsterdam has received a grant from the Australia Council. His books have been translated into Dutch, French, Italian and Hebrew.

Works
Things We Didn't See Coming (2009) 
What the Family Needed (2012)
The Easy Way Out (2016)

Honors
The Easy Way Out
Miles Franklin Award, longlist
ALS Gold Medal, shortlist
Australian Book Industry Awards, longlist

What the Family Needed
International Dublin Literary Award, longlist
The Age Book of the Year, shortlist
Encore Award, shortlist
Prime Minister's Literary Awards, longlist
ALS Gold Medal, longlist

Things We Didn't See Coming
The Age Book of the Year, Fiction Book of the Year, winner
The Guardian First Book Award, longlist
New South Wales Premier's Literary Awards for New Fiction, shortlist

References

External links
 Author Website
 Twenty-One Sons at FiveChapters
 All the Black Swans at Huffington Post

1966 births
Living people
21st-century American novelists
American male novelists
Writers from New York City
21st-century American male writers
Novelists from New York (state)